Events in the year 1834 in Portugal.

Incumbents
Monarch: Michael I (until 26 May); Mary II
Prime Minister: Pedro de Sousa Holstein, 1st Duke of Palmela

Events
16 May – Battle of Asseiceira
26 May – Concession of Evoramonte, ending the civil war period; Miguel I of Portugal surrendered 
 30 May - Extinction of religious orders by D. Pedro and his minister Joaquim António de Aguiar
24 September – Pedro de Sousa Holstein, 1st Duke of Palmela becomes the first official prime minister of Portugal
The National Republican Guard established

Arts and entertainment

Sports

Births

Deaths

24 September – King Dom Pedro IV, King of Portugal, Emperor of Brazil (born 1798).

References

 
1830s in Portugal
Portugal
Years of the 19th century in Portugal
Portugal